This is a list of lizards found in South Africa.

 Agama armata
 Bibron's thick-toed gecko
 Broadley's flat lizard
 Cape dwarf gecko
 Cape flat lizard
 Cape grass lizard
 Common flat lizard
 Dwarf flat lizard
 Hemicordylus
 Lebombo flat lizard
 Nile monitor
 Nucras caesicaudata
 Pachydactylus atorquatus
 Pachydactylus austeni
 Pachydactylus geitje
 Pachydactylus labialis
 Pachydactylus rangei
 Scelotes limpopoensis
 Trachylepis capensis
 Trachylepis punctatissima
 Trachylepis spilogaster
 Trachylepis striata
 Transvaal girdled lizard
 Transvaal grass lizard
 Typhlacontias brevipes
 Warren's girdled lizard
 Zoutpansberg girdled lizard

References

Lizards
 South Africa